Ferla (Sicilian: A Ferra) is a town and comune in the Province of Syracuse, Sicily (southern Italy).

The Necropolis of Pantalica, part of the UNESCO World Heritage Site of "Syracuse and the Rocky Necropolis of Pantalica" is situated between Ferla and Sortino.

References

Municipalities of the Province of Syracuse